Dorothy Green (March 31, 1897 – December 13, 1964) was an American tennis player of the start of the 20th century.

In 1912, she won the women's doubles at the US Women's National Championship with Mary Kendall Browne, who beat her the following year in the singles final.

Green was a member of the Merion Cricket Club.

Grand Slam finals

Singles (1 runner-up)

Women's doubles (1 title, 3 runner-ups)

Mixed doubles

References

1897 births
American female tennis players
United States National champions (tennis)
1964 deaths
Grand Slam (tennis) champions in women's doubles
20th-century American women
20th-century American people